66th ACE Eddie Awards
January 29, 2016

Feature Film (Dramatic): 
Mad Max: Fury Road

Feature Film (Comedy or Musical): 
The Big Short

The 66th American Cinema Editors Eddie Awards were presented on January 29, 2016 at the Beverly Hilton Hotel, honoring the best editors in films and television.

Winners and nominees

Film 
Best Edited Feature Film – Dramatic:

Margaret Sixel – Mad Max: Fury Road
 Pietro Scalia – The Martian
 Stephen Mirrione  – The Revenant
 Joe Walker – Sicario
 Maryann Brandon and Mary Jo Markey– Star Wars: The Force Awakens
Best Edited Feature Film – Comedy or Musical:

Hank Corwin – The Big Short
 Dan Lebental and Colby Parker, Jr. – Ant-Man
 Alan Baumgarten, Jay Cassidy, Tom Cross and Christopher Tellefsen – Joy
 David Trachtenberg – Me and Earl and the Dying Girl
 William Kerr and Paul Zucker – Trainwreck
Best Edited Animated Feature Film:

Kevin Nolting – Inside Out
 Garret Elkins – Anomalisa
 Stephen Schaffer – The Good Dinosaur
Best Edited Documentary Feature:

Chris King – Amy
 Joe Beshenkovsky and Brett Morgen – Kurt Cobain: Montage of Heck
 Andy Grieve – Going Clear: Scientology and the Prison of Belief
 Greg Finton, Brad Fuller and Brian Johnson – He Named Me Malala
 Claire Scanlon – The Wrecking Crew

Television 
Best Edited Half-Hour Series for Television:

Nick Paley – Inside Amy Schumer: "12 Angry Men Inside Amy Schumer"
 Brian Merken – Silicon Valley: "Two Days of the Condor"
 Gary Dollner – Veep: "Election Night"

Best Edited One Hour Series for Commercial Television:

Tom Wilson – Mad Men:  "Person to Person"
 Kelley Dixon – Better Call Saul: "Five-O"
 Skip Macdonald – Better Call Saul: "Uno"
 Skip Macdonald and Curtis Thurber – Fargo: "Did You Do This? No, You Did It!"
 Scott Vickrey – The Good Wife: "Restraint"
Best Edited One Hour Series for Non-Commercial Television:

Lisa Bromwell – House of Cards: "Chapter 39"
 Katie Weiland – Game of Thrones: "The Dance of Dragons"
 Tim Porter – Game of Thrones: "Hardhome"
 Harvey Rosenstock – Homeland: "The Tradition of Hospitality"
 Steven Soderbergh – The Knick: "Wonderful Surprises"
Best Edited Mini-Series or Motion Picture for Television:

Brian A. Kates – Bessie
 Maysie Hoy – Dolly Parton's Coat of Many Colors
 Jeffrey M. Werner – Orange Is the New Black: '"Trust No Bitch"
Best Edited Documentary for Television:

Richard Hankin, Zac Stuart-Pontier, Caitlyn Greene, Shelby Siegel – The Jinx: The Life and Deaths of Robert Durst: "Chapter 1: A Body in the Bay"
 Joshua L. Pearson – Keith Richards: Under the Influence
 Chris A. Peterson – The Seventies: "The United States vs. Nixon"
Best Edited Non-Scripted Series

Hunter Gross – Anthony Bourdain: Parts Unknown: "Bay Area"
 Josh Earl and Ben Bulatao – Deadliest Catch: "Zero Hour"
 Eric Driscoll, Nik Jamgocyan, Chris Kirkpatrick, David Michael Maurer, Greg McDonald, Marcus Miller and Alexandria Scott – Whale Wars: "The Darkest Hour"

References

External links

66
2015 film awards
2015 guild awards
2016 in American cinema